There's... Johnny! is an American comedy-drama streaming television series created by Paul Reiser and David Steven Simon and starring Ian Nelson, Jane Levy, T'Keyah Crystal Keymáh, and Tony Danza. The series takes place in the 1970s and depicts the fictional goings-on behind the scenes of The Tonight Show Starring Johnny Carson. The series was ordered by streaming service Seeso and had been scheduled to premiere on August 24, 2017, but that release was canceled due to Seeso's closure. The streaming service Hulu subsequently acquired the streaming rights to the series and released all seven produced episodes on November 16, 2017.

Premise
There's... Johnny! follows "the lives and challenges of Andy, a wide-eyed 19-year-old Nebraskan who stumbles his way into a job at The Tonight Show Starring Johnny Carson and Joy, a young Talent Coordinator on the show, as they both try to find their way and prove themselves in this period of cultural and political upheaval." The series also touches on "major historical events of the time, including the Vietnam War, Nixon, and the strengthening counter-culture, as well the show’s status as one of the most popular and important cultural institution of its day."

Cast and characters

Main
 Ian Nelson as Andy Klavin, a young man from Nebraska who, after writing a fan letter to The Tonight Show Starring Johnny Carson, finds himself accepting a job and moving to Los Angeles.
 Jane Levy as Joy Greenfield, The Tonight Shows talent coordinator.
 T'Keyah Crystal Keymáh as Roz, Johnny Carson's secretary
 Tony Danza as Fred de Cordova, a producer on The Tonight Show.

Recurring
 Roger Bart as Angelo
 Nate Smith as Mike, a writer for The Tonight Show
 David Hoffman as Jim, a writer for The Tonight Show
 Daniel Strauss as Alan, a writer for The Tonight Show
 Andrew Schulz as Mitch, a writer for The Tonight Show
 Camrus Johnson as Rasheed, Andy's neighbor and friend
 Alison Martin as Lorraine Klavin, Andy's mother
 Abigail Klein as Chrissy-Ann Aldean, a beauty pageant winner from Andy's hometown who arrives in Hollywood
 Don Stark as Bernie Greenfield, Joy's father who holds a powerful position within the entertainment industry
 Johnny Ferro as Buddy Klavin, Andy's brother who returns after serving in the Vietnam War.
 Ari Frenkel as Tom Donahue
 Reggie A. Green as a security guard

Guest

 Josh Randall as Officer ("Dog Day Afternoon")
 Joseph Anderson as Stagehand ("Dog Day Afternoon")
 Kevin Pollak as the phone voice of Albert Brooks ("Dog Day Afternoon")
 Peggy Lipton as Evelyn Greenfield ("Owed to Joy")
 David Paymer as Dr. Neuberger ("Take Me to Church")
 Kate Vernon as Mrs. de Cordova ("Take Me to Church")
 Matt McCoy as Father Mike ("Take Me to Church")
 Josh Zuckerman as Justin ("Take Me to Church")
 Georgina Reilly as Sarah ("Take Me to Church")
 Dirk Blocker as Lyle ("The Getaway")
 Jesse D. Goins as Dr. William Miller ("The Getaway")

Episodes

Production

Development
On October 11, 2016, it was announced that Seeso had given the production a series order for a first season consisting of eight episodes. The series was written by Paul Reiser and David Steven Simon, both of whom were also set to executive produce alongside David Gordon Green, Jeff Sotzing, Brian Volk-Weiss, Michael Pelmont, Cisco Henson, Matt Ochacher, Evan Shapiro, Kelsey Balance, and Dan Kerstetter. Green was also slated to serve as director for the series as well and Craig Knizek was set as a producer. The series was produced in conjunction with the estate of Johnny Carson and was granted access to the full Carson archives, allowing the show to mix newly filmed content with authentic footage of Carson and his guests onscreen. Production companies involved with the series were anticipated to include Nuance Productions, Rough House Pictures, and Comedy Dynamics.

Casting
On January 23, 2017, it was announced that Tony Danza, Ian Nelson, Jane Levy, Roger Bart, T'Keyah Crystal Keymáh, Nate Smith, David Hoffman, Daniel Strauss, and Andrew Schulz had been cast in the series.

Release

Marketing
On November 6, 2017, a trailer for the series was released.

Premiere
On April 27, 2017, the series held its world premiere during the Tribeca Film Festival at the SVA Theatre in New York City. Following a screening of the first episode, a conversation was held with creators Paul Reiser and David Steven Simon, executive producer David Gordon Green, and cast members Tony Danza, Ian Nelson, and Jane Levy. The conversation was moderated by journalist Bill Carter.

Distribution
On March 30, 2017, it was reported that the series would premiere on August 24, 2017. On August 9, 2017, it was announced that Seeso was shutting down and that the series would not premiere that month as previously announced. A week later, it was reported that NBCUniversal was actively searching for a new outlet for the series. On September 27, 2017, it was announced that Hulu had acquired the streaming rights to the series. On October 13, 2017, it was announced that the series would now premiere on Hulu on November 16, 2017.
The seven episodes of the show are currently available on the Peacock service.

Reception
The series received mixed response from critics upon its premiere. On the review aggregation website Rotten Tomatoes, the first season holds an 83% approval rating, with an average rating of 7 out of 10 based on 6 reviews. Metacritic, which uses a weighted average, assigned the season a score of 60 out of 100 based on 6 critics, indicating "mixed or average reviews".

In a mixed to negative review, The Los Angeles Times Chris Barton praised the use of footage from The Tonight Show but criticized other aspects of the production saying, "Given its roots in comedy, There's... Johnny remains strongest in its reverent time travels with Carson as well as his fellow comedy giants such as George Carlin and Steve Martin, who also appear in Tonight Show clips. The appeal there is undeniable. But as the real world creeps in, There's... Johnny! strains under a weight that even the present is struggling to resolve." In a more positive review, Indiewires Steve Greene gave the series a grade of "B+" and praised it saying, "There's... Johnny! is unabashedly a tribute, filtered through the glow of fondness for a time gone by. Not without its second-guessing, there’s still a lovely underpinning of specificity that finds some honesty among the nostalgia. TV is an increasingly strange business, but There's... Johnny! argues that there’s still a bit of magic in the chaos."

Notes

References

External links

2010s American comedy-drama television series
English-language television shows
2017 American television series debuts
Television shows filmed in Los Angeles
Television shows set in Los Angeles